This is a timeline documenting events of Jazz in the year 2011.

Events

January 
 20 – The 6th Ice Music Festival started in Geilo, Norway (January 20 – 23).
 26 – The first Bodø Jazz Open started in Bodø, Norway (January 26 – 29).

February
 3 – The 13th Polarjazz Festival started in Longyearbyen, Svalbard (February 3 – 7).

March
 4 – The 7th Jakarta International Java Jazz Festival started in Jakarta, Indonesia (March 4 – 6).

April
 15 – The 38th Vossajazz started in Voss, Norway (April 15 – 17).
 16
 Mari Kvien Brunvoll was awarded Vossajazzprisen 2011.
 Mathias Eick performed the commissioned work Voss at Vossajazz
 27 – The 17th SoddJazz started in Inderøy, Norway (April 27 – May 1).
 30 – The International Jazz Day.

May
 25 – The 39th Nattjazz started in Bergen, Norway (May 25 – June 4).

June
 10 – The 40th Moers Festival started in Moers, Germany (June 10 – 11).
 15 – The 23rd Jazz Fest Wien started in Vienna, Austria (June 15 – July 17).
 17 – The 28th Stockholm Jazz Festival started in Stockholm, Sweden (June 17 – 19).
 25 – The 31st Montreal International Jazz Festival started in Montreal, Quebec, Canada (June 25 – July 4).

July
 1
 The 33rd Copenhagen Jazz Festival started in Copenhagen, Denmark (July 1 – 10).
 The 45th Montreux Jazz Festival started in Montreux, Switzerland (July 1 – 16).
 6 – The 47th Kongsberg Jazzfestival started in Kongsberg, Norway (July 6 – 9).
 8
 The 36th North Sea Jazz Festival started in The Hague, Netherlands (July 8 – 10).
 The 64th Nice Jazz Festival started in Nice, France (July 8 – 12).
 9 – The 46th Pori Jazz Festival started in Pori, Finland (July 9 – 17).
 18 – The 51st Moldejazz started in Molde, Norway (July 18 – 23).
 21 – The 46th San Sebastian Jazz Festival started in San Sebastian, Spain (July 21 – 25).

August
 5 – The 55th Newport Jazz Festival started in Newport, Rhode Island (August 5 – 7).
 10 – The 25th Sildajazz started in Haugesund, Norway (August 10–14).
12
 Marius Neset is awarded the Sildajazzprisen 2011.
 The 27th Brecon Jazz Festival started in Brecon, Wales (August 12 – 14).
 15 – The 26th Oslo Jazzfestival started in Oslo, Norway (August 15 – 20).

September
 1 – The 7th Punktfestivalen started in Kristiansand, Norway (September 1 – 3).
 16 – The 54th Monterey Jazz Festival started in Monterey, California (September 16 – 18).

October

November
 11 – 20th London Jazz Festival started in London, England (November 11 – 20).

December
 18 – Eldbjørg Raknes was awarded the Norwegian jazz award Buddyprisen 2011.

Album released

January

February

March

April

May

June

July

August

September

October

November

December

Deaths

 January
 1 – Charles Fambrough, American bassist, composer, and record producer (born 1950).
 27 – Charlie Callas, American drummer, comedian, and actor (born 1924).
 29 – Milton Babbitt, American composer, music theorist, and teacher (born 1916).

 February
 3 – Tony Levin, English jazz drummer (born 1940).
 8 – Eugenio Toussaint, Mexican composer, arranger, and musician (born 1954).
 14 – George Shearing, British jazz pianist (born 1919).
 24 – Jens Winther, Danish jazz trumpeter, composer, and bandleader (born 1960).

 March
 4 – Tom Vaughn, American pianist (born 1936).
 11 – Billy Bang, American violinist and composer (born 1947).
 12 – Joe Morello, American drummer (born 1928).
 15 – Melvin Sparks, American guitarist (born 1946).

 April
 26 – Phoebe Snow, American singer, songwriter, and guitarist (born 1950).

 May
 8 – Cornell Dupree, American guitarist (born 1942).
 10 – Norma Zimmer, American singer (born 1923).
 11 – Snooky Young, American trumpeter (born 1919).
 12 – Ted Nash, American saxophonist, flautist, and clarinetist (born 1922).
 15 – Bob Flanigan, American tenor vocalist and founding member of The Four Freshmen (born 1926).
 28 – Alys Robi, French-Canadian singer (born 1923).

 June
 2 – Ray Bryant, American pianist and composer (born 1931).
 3 – Jack Kevorkian, American flautist, composer, pathologist, and euthanasia proponent (born 1928).
 10 – György Szabados, Hungarian jazz pianist (born 1939).
 20 – Ottilie Patterson, Northern Irish singer (born 1932).

 July
 2 – Paul Weeden, American-born Norwegian jazz guitarist (born 1923)
 17 – Joe Lee Wilson, American singer (born 1935).
 23 – Amy Winehouse, English singer and songwriter (born 1983).
 24 – Harald Johnsen, Norwegian bassist (heart attack) (born 1970).
 26 – Frank Foster, American tenor and soprano saxophonist, flautist, arranger, and composer (born 1928).

 August
 7 – Jiří Traxler, Czech-Canadian pianist, composer, lyricist, and arranger (born 1912).

 September
 7 – Eddie Marshall, American drummer (born 1938).
 9 – Graham Collier, English bassist, bandleader, and composer (born 1937).
 12 – Dinah Kaye, Scottish singer (born 1924).
 19 – Johnny Răducanu, Romanian pianist (born 1931).

 October
 1 – Butch Ballard, American drummer (born 1918).
 8 – Roger Williams, American pianist (born 1924).
 10 – Lucy Ann Polk, American singer (born 1927).
 19 – Lars Sjösten, Swedish pianist and composer (born 1941).
 28 – Beryl Davis, English singer (born 1924).
 29 – Walter Norris, American pianist and composer (born 1931).

 November
 1
 André Hodeir, French violinist, composer, arranger, and musicologist (born 1921).
 Christiane Legrand, French soprano, The Swingle Singers (born 1930).
 2 – Papa Bue, Danish trombonist and bandleader (born 1930).
 6 – Gordon Beck, English pianist and composer (born 1935).
 11 – Michael Garrick, English pianist and composerr (born 1933).
 19 – Russell Garcia, American composer and music arranger (born 1916).
 22 – Paul Motian, American drummer (born 1931).
 24 – Ross McManus, Irish-English trumpeter (born 1927).

 December
 2 – Bill Tapia, American guitarist (born 1908).
 15 – Bob Brookmeyer, American valve trombonist, pianist, and composer (born 1929).
 17 – Cesária Évora, Cape Verdean singer (born 1941).
 18 – Ralph MacDonald, Trinbagonian-American percussionist, songwriter, and steelpan virtuoso (born 1941).
 26 – Sam Rivers, American saxophonist, bass clarinetist, flautist, harmonica player and pianist, and composer (born 1923).

See also

 List of 2011 albums
 List of years in jazz
 2010s in jazz
 2011 in music

References

External links 
 History Of Jazz Timeline: 2011 at All About Jazz

2010s in jazz
Jazz